Clermont Airport  is an airport serving Clermont, Queensland, Australia.

See also
 List of airports in Queensland

References

Airports in Queensland
Buildings and structures in Central Queensland